The Ramco Cements Limited (formerly Madras Cements Limited) is a part of the Ramco Group with headquarters in Chennai, India. Ramco Cements has 5 Integrated Cement manufacturing units, 6 grinding units, and 1 Packing terminal across India. The company also produces Ready-Mix Concrete(RMC) and Dry Mortar products. The company has a Research Centre (Ramco Research & Development Centre) in Chennai and operates wind farms in Tamil Nadu and Karnataka.

Operations

Cement 
The company's main product is Portland cement, manufactured in eleven production facilities that include Integrated Cement plants and Grinding units with a current total production capacity of 21 MTPA.

It manufactures and markets Ordinary Portland Cements (OPC) and Blended Cements (PPC). The company has Integrated Cement plants at

 Alathiyur (in Tamil Nadu)
 Ariyalur (in Tamil Nadu)
 Kolimigundla (in Andhra Pradesh)
 Jayanthipuram, Jaggayyapeta (in Andhra Pradesh)
 Virudhunagar (in Tamil Nadu)

Grinding units at

 Uthiramerur (in Tamil Nadu)
 Valapady (in Tamil Nadu)
 Kolaghat (in West Bengal)
 Visakhapatnam (in Andhra Pradesh)
 Haridaspur (in Odisha)
 Mathod (in Karnataka)

and Packing unit at

 Nagercoil (in Tamil Nadu)

Dry Mortar  
The Dry Mortar products consisting of Tile Mix, Tile Grout, Block adhesives and Putty are manufactured at 
 Sriperumbudur, Chennai
 Vazhapadi, Salem, Tamil Nadu
 RR Nagar, Virudhunagar (in Tamil Nadu)

Ready Mix Concrete(RMC) 
The Ready Mix concrete unit is located at 
 Vengaivasal, Medavakkam, Chennai

Wind Power Generation 
Ramco Cements opened its first wind farm at Muppandal in 1993. In 1995, Ramco Cements installed 69 additional windmills at Poolavadi near Coimbatore. As of 2019, the total installed windmill capacity is 165.785 MW with 235 individual units.

History 
Ramco Cements was established as Madras Cements in 1961 by Shri. P.A.C. Ramasamy Raja, an industrialist and the founder of Ramco Group of Companies. The first plant commenced operation at Ramasamy Raja Nagar Plant, Aruppukkottai, Virudhunagar District, Tamil Nadu. They are the first to adopt dry process kiln technology and vertical roller mills which help in energy efficiency.

References

See also 
 Ramco Systems
 Ramco Institute of Technology
 ParentCircle

Cement companies of India
Indian brands
Manufacturing companies based in Chennai
Indian companies established in 1961
1961 establishments in Madras State
Manufacturing companies established in 1961
Companies listed on the National Stock Exchange of India
Companies listed on the Bombay Stock Exchange